Beartrap Hollow (also known as Bear Trap Hollow) is a tributary of White Deer Hole Creek in Lycoming County, Pennsylvania, in the United States. The stream is not designated as an impaired waterbody. Much of the stream's length is on South White Deer Ridge and it is near Tiadaghton State Forest.

Course
Beartrap Hollow begins on South White Deer Ridge in Washington Township. It flows north down the ridge for several tenths of a mile before turning north-northwest. After several tenths of a mile, the stream reaches the bottom of the ridge and receives an unnamed tributary from the left. It then turns northeast for a short distance before reaching its confluence with White Deer Hole Creek.

Tributaries
Beartrap Hollow has no named tributaries. However, it does have one unnamed tributary. It joins Beartrap Hollow in its lower reaches.

Hydrology, geography, and geology

The headwaters of Beartrap Hollow are on a ridge known as South White Deer Ridge. The ridge is relatively steep in the stream's upper reaches, but becomes less steep towards the lower reaches of the stream. It flows down into the broad valley of White Deer Hole Creek.

Beartrap Hollow is in the Ridge and Valley Freestone region.

Beartrap Hollow is not designated as an impaired waterbody.

Watershed and biology
The stream is entirely within the United States Geological Survey quadrangle of Williamsport SE. Its mouth is located near Elmsport.

Beartrap Hollow is being considered by the Pennsylvania Fish and Boat Commission for wild trout designation.

History and recreation
The valley of Beartrap Hollow was entered into the Geographic Names Information System on August 2, 1979. Its identifier in the Geographic Names Information System is 1168978. The stream does not have a name of its own, but instead takes its name from the valley through which it flows. It is also known as Bear Trap Hollow.

Beartrap Hollow was surveyed by the Pennsylvania Fish and Boat Commission on June 14, 2013. It was listed on the Pennsylvania Fish and Boat Commission website as being considered for wild trout designation on January 20, 2015.

Beartrap Hollow is located near Tiadaghton State Forest.

See also
Spring Creek (White Deer Hole Creek), next tributary of White Deer Hole Creek going downstream
List of rivers of Pennsylvania

References

Rivers of Lycoming County, Pennsylvania
Tributaries of the West Branch Susquehanna River
Rivers of Pennsylvania